The 15009/15010 Gorakhpur–Mailani Express is an Express train belonging to North Eastern Railway zone that runs between Mailani Junction railway station and  in India. It is currently being operated with 15009/15010 train numbers on a daily basis.

Service

The 15009/Gorakhpur–Mailani Express has an average speed of 36 km/hr and covers 541 km in 13h.

The 15010/Mailani–Gorakhpur Express  has an average speed of 37 km/hr and covers 541 km in 13h.

Route and halts 
The important halts of the train are:

Coach composition

The train has LHB rakes with max speed of 110 kmph. The train consists of 16 coaches:

 1 AC III Tier
 5 Sleeper coaches
 8 General Unreserved
 2 Seating cum Luggage Rake

Traction

Both trains are hauled by a Gonda Loco Shed-based WDM-3A diesel locomotive from Gorakhpur to Mailani and vice versa.

See also 

 Gorakhpur Junction railway station

Notes

References

External links 

 15009/Gorakhpur–Sitapur Jn. Express India Rail Info
 15010/Sitapur Jn.–Gorakhpur Express India Rail Info

Sitapur
Passenger trains originating from Gorakhpur
Express trains in India
Railway services introduced in 2016